OneRepublic is an American pop rock band from Colorado Springs, Colorado. Formed in 2002 by Ryan Tedder and Zach Filkins, the band achieved commercial success on Myspace as an unsigned act. In late 2003, after OneRepublic played shows throughout the Los Angeles area, a number of record labels approached the band with interest, but OneRepublic ultimately signed with Velvet Hammer, an imprint of Columbia Records. They made their first album with producer Greg Wells during the summer and fall of 2005 at his studio, Rocket Carousel, in Culver City, California. The album was originally scheduled for release on June 6, 2006, but the group was dropped by Columbia two months before the album ever came out. The lead single of that album, "Apologize", was released in 2005. It received some recognition on Myspace in 2006.

In 2007, OneRepublic released their debut album, Dreaming Out Loud. Its lead single "Apologize" was notably remixed by Timbaland, becoming a huge international success, reaching number one in sixteen countries, subsequently earning them a Grammy Award nomination. The second single, "Stop and Stare" mirrored its predecessor's success. The album was later certified Platinum by the Recording Industry Association of America (RIAA). The band's second album, Waking Up (2009), produced the successful singles, "All the Right Moves", "Secrets", "Marchin On", and "Good Life", the latter reaching the top ten of the US Billboard Hot 100.

OneRepublic's third album, Native (2013), became the band's first top ten album on the Billboard 200, and highest-charting album to date, charting at number four. The lead single, "If I Lose Myself" charted within the top ten in several countries, while the album's third single, "Counting Stars", became the band's most successful single in recent years, obtaining top five placements in Australia, Canada, Germany, Ireland, New Zealand, the U.S. and the UK. This marks their highest-charting single in the United Kingdom to date. It has also peaked at number 2 on the US Billboard Hot 100, matching their highest peak of "Apologize" in 2007.

American Music Awards
The American Music Awards is an annually held awards ceremony for outstanding achievements for American artists in the record industry, which airs on ABC. OneRepublic has received no awards from four nominations.

|-
|align="center" | 2011
| rowspan="4" | OneRepublic
| rowspan="2" | Favorite Pop/Rock Band/Duo/Group
| 
|-
|align="center" rowspan="2" | 2014
| 
|-
| Favorite Adult Contemporary Artist
| 
|-
|align="center" | 2022
| Favorite Pop Duo or Group
|

Billboard Music Awards
The Billboard Music Awards is an annual awards show from Billboard Magazine. OneRepublic has received no awards from three nominations.

|-
|align="center" rowspan="3" | 2014 || rowspan="2" | OneRepublic || Top Duo/Group || 
|-
| Billboard Milestone Award || 
|-
|"Counting Stars" || Top Digital Song ||

CMT Music Awards
The CMT Music Awards is a fan-voted awards show for country music videos and television performances. OneRepublic have received no award from one nomination.

|-
|align="center" | 2014 || "Counting Stars" (shared with Dierks Bentley) || Performance of the Year ||

Echo Awards
The Echo Awards is a German music award event which is held annually, where the year's winners are decided by the band's sales from the previous year. OneRepublic has received no awards from two nominations.

|-
|align="center" | 2008 || "Apologize" (shared with Timbaland) || National/International Hit of the Year || 
|-
|align="center" | 2009 || OneRepublic || Best International Group ||

Eska Music Awards
Eska Music Awards (EMA) is a major Polish awards ceremony for national and international music launched in 2002 by Radio Eska. OneRepublic have received one award from one nomination.

|-
|align="center" | 2010 || OneRepublic || International Band of the Year ||

Grammy Awards
The Grammy Awards is an annual music awards show held by the National Academy of Recording Arts and Sciences of the United States for outstanding achievements in the record industry. OneRepublic has received no awards from two nominations.

|-
|align="center" | 
| "Apologize"
| Best Pop Performance by a Duo or Group with Vocal
| 
|-
|align="center" | 2022
| Themselves
| Most Popular Grammy Artist
|

iHeart Radio Music Awards
iHeartRadio Music Awards is an inaugural music award show presented by Clear Channel Communications's platform iHeartRadio and NBC. OneRepublic has received no awards from one nomination.

|-
| 2015 || "Counting Stars" || Best Lyrics ||

LOS40 Music Awards
The LOS40 Music Awards, formerly Los Premios 40 Principales, is an annual Spanish awards show that recognises the people and works of pop musicians. OneRepublic have received one award from four nominations.

|-
|align="center" | 2008 || "Apologize" || Best International Song || 
|-
|align="center" rowspan="2" | 2014 || OneRepublic || Best International Act || 
|-
| "Counting Stars" || Best International Song || 
|-
| align="center | 2016 || "Wherever I Go" || International Video of the Year ||

Lunas del Auditorio

MTV Awards

MTV Asia Awards
The biannual MTV Asia Awards is the Asian equivalent of the Australian MTV Australia Awards. The awards are for the recognition to Asian and international icons in music, among other areas. OneRepublic has received one award from two nominations.

|-
|align="centre" rowspan="2" | 2008 || "Apologize" (shared with Timbaland) || Best Hook Up || 
|-
| OneRepublic || Breakthrough Artist ||

MTV Europe Music Awards
The MTV Europe Music Awards is an annual awards ceremony established in 1994 by MTV Europe for the best in European music. OneRepublic has received no awards from two nomination.

|-
|align="center" | 2008 || rowspan="2"| OneRepublic || Best New Act || 
|-
|align="center" | 2016 || Best World Stage Performance ||

MuchMusic Video Awards
The MuchMusic Video Awards is an annual awards ceremony presented by the Canadian music video channel MuchMusic for music videos. OneRepublic have received no awards from two nominations.

|-
|align="centre" rowspan="2" | 2008 || "Apologize" (shared with Timbaland) || Best International Video – Group || 
|-
| "Stop and Stare" || Best International Video – Group ||

Nickelodeon Kids Choice Awards
The Nickelodeon Kids Choice Awards is an annual award show that were kids vote for their Favorite Movies, TV, Music, and Sports. OneRepublic have received no awards from two nominations.

|-
|align="center" | 2014 || rowspan="3" | OneRepublic || Favorite Music Group || 
|-
|align="center" | 2015 || Favorite Music Group || 
|-
| align="center" | 2016 || Favorite Music Group ||

NRJ Music Awards
The NRJ Music Awards is an annual awards show celebrating the best domestic and international music in France as voted by fans of NRJ Radio.  OneRepublic has received one nomination.

|-
|align="center" | 2017 || rowspan="3" | OneRepublic (with Amir) || Francophone Duo/Group of the Year ||

People's Choice Awards
The People's Choice Awards is an annual CBS awards show that recognises the people and works of popular culture. OneRepublic has received no awards from three nominations.

|-
|align="center" | 2009 || "Apologize" || Favorite Rock Song || 
|-
|align="center" | 2014 || OneRepublic || Favorite Band || 
|-
|align="center" | 2015 || OneRepublic || Favorite Group ||

Teen Choice Awards
The Teen Choice Awards are an annual awards ceremony from Fox Broadcasting Company. OneRepublic received eight nominations.

|-
|align="center" rowspan="2" | 2008 || OneRepublic || Choice Breakout Group || 
|-
| "Stop and Stare" || Choice Rock Track || 
|-
|align="center" | 2010 || "All the Right Moves" || Choice Rock Track || 
|-
|align="center" rowspan="2" | 2011 || OneRepublic || Choice Rock Group || 
|-
| "Good Life" || Choice Rock Track || 
|-
|align="center" rowspan="2" | 2014 || OneRepublic || Choice Rock Group || 
|-
| "Love Runs Out" || Choice Rock Song || 
|-
|align="center"|2015 || OneRepublic || Choice Music Group: Male || 
|-
|align="center" rowspan="2" | 2016 || "Wherever I Go" || Choice Rock Song || 
|-
| OneRepublic || Choice Summer Music Star Group ||

Webby Awards
A Webby Award is an award for excellence on the Internet presented annually by The International Academy of Digital Arts and Sciences.

|-
|align="center" |2017
| "Kids"
| Best Music Video
|

World Music Awards
The World Music Awards is an international awards ceremony that annually honors recording artists based on worldwide sales figures provided by the International Federation of the Phonographic Industry. OneRepublic has received no awards from one nomination.

|-
|align="center" | 2012 || OneRepublic || Best Group ||

Žebřík Music Awards

!Ref.
|-
| 2009
| "All the Right Moves"
| Best International Song
| 
|

References

Awards
Lists of awards received by American musician
Lists of awards received by musical group